Tianning District is one of five districts under the jurisdiction of Changzhou in Jiangsu province of the People's Republic of China. The local language is the Changzhou dialect of Wu Chinese. The postal code for the district is 213003.

The Tianning District covers an area of 68 square kilometers. In 2007 the total population was recorded at 520,00 people.

The area is most famous for the Tianning Temple for which the district is named. The temple is home to the tallest pagoda in the world.  The pagoda forms the most notable landmark in the downtown area.

Tianning District is also home to Hongmei Park, which borders the temple grounds to the north.  The park is reported to attract 200 million tourists each year. It is also home to Red Plum Pavilion, a structure originally built 1000 years ago, as well as the Yizhou Pavilion, built to commemorate the poet Su Dongpo, who died in Changzhou.

Administrative divisions
In the present, Tianning District has 6 subdistricts and 1 other.
6 subdistricts

1 Other
 Tianning Economic Development Zone

Economy
Da Niang Dumpling has its corporate headquarters in the district.

Tourist attractions
The district houses many ancient bridges, such as Xinfang Bridge and Zhongxin Bridge.

Chongfa Temple is a former Buddhist temple located within the Renmin Park and now is a teahouse.

Notes

External links
Official site of the Tianning district government (Chinese)

County-level divisions of Jiangsu
Changzhou